The Swiss Open Gstaad (currently sponsored by EFG International and called the EFG Swiss Open Gstaad) is a tennis tournament held in Gstaad, Switzerland. The tournament is played on outdoor clay courts. Between 1971 and 1989 it was an event of the Grand Prix tennis circuit and is now a part of the ATP Tour schedule as an ATP Tour 250 series event.

History
The Swiss International Championships was founded in 1897 and staged at the Grasshopper Club, Zurich under the auspices of the Swiss Lawn Tennis Association. In 1898 the Swiss Lawn Tennis Association staged the event at Château-d'Œx. In 1899 an open women's singles event was added to the schedule, when the venue was still in Saint Moritz.  It was then hosted at multiple locations throughout its run including Gstaad. The first edition of the Gstaad International tournament was played in 1915 at the Gstaad Palace Hotel, which was known at the time as the Royal Hotel, Winter & Gstaad Palace, and was organized in collaboration with the Lawn Tennis Club (LTC) Gstaad. The first event was played on clay courts and was won by Victor de Coubasch. For the years 1937,48–49, 52, 54–55, 57–58, 60–61, 63, 66–67 this tournament was valid as the Swiss International Championships. In 1968 it became known as the Swiss Open Championhips.

The Swiss International Championships were staged at the following locations throughout its run including Basel, Champéry, Geneva, Gstaad, Les Avants, Montreux, Lausanne, Lugano, Lucerne, Ragatz, St. Moritz, Zermatt, and Zurich from 1897 to 1967.

Gstaad is located 1,050 metres (3,450 feet) above sea level. It is the highest venue for ATP Tour events in Europe, although lower than the Ecuador Open and the former Colombia Open, both held at the Andes.

Past finals

Singles

Doubles

See also
 Swiss Indoors – men's indoors tournament
 WTA Swiss Open – women's tournament

References

External links 
 
 ATP tournament profile

 
Tennis tournaments in Switzerland
Clay court tennis tournaments
ATP Tour
Recurring sporting events established in 1968